Orotidine is a nucleoside formed by attaching orotic acid to a ribose ring via a β-N1-glycosidic bond. It is found in bacteria, fungi and plants. It was first isolated in 1951 from the fungus Neurospora by A. Michael Michelson, William Drell, and Herschel K. Mitchell. In humans, orotidine occurs as its 5'-phosphate (orotidylic acid), which is an intermediate in pyrimidine nucleotide biosynthesis (cytidine and uridine) that are found in nucleic acids. Orotidine itself is not a component of nucleic acid. Large amounts of orotidine are excreted in the urine of cancer patients treated with 6-azauridine.

The symbol commonly used for orotidine is O or Ord.

Notes

Nucleosides
Pyrimidinediones
Hydroxymethyl compounds